Tuesday is a day of the week.

Tuesday may also refer to:

Music
 Tuesday (band), an American pop-punk/emo band

Albums
 Tuesday (album), by Reamonn

Songs
 "Tuesday" (ILoveMakonnen song) (2014), featuring Drake
 "Tuesday" (Trey Anastasio song) (2005)
 "Tuesday" (You Am I song) (1997)
 "Tuesday", from 4am Friday (1996) by Avail
 "Tuesday", from Upstairs at Eric's (1982) by Yazoo
 "Tuesday", from Angel Milk (2005) by Telepopmusik

People
 Tuesday Knight (born 1969), an American actress born Melody Lynn Knight
 Tuesday Middaugh (born 1973), an American former synchronized swimmer
 Tuesday Weld (born 1943), an American actress born Susan Ker Weld
 Gayle Tuesday, a pseudonym of Brenda Gilhooly (born 1964), an English comedian
 Tuesday Vargas (born 1979), Filipina actress, comedian, and singer

Other uses
 Tuesday (2008 film), a 2008 British crime film
 Tuesday (upcoming film), an American-British drama-fantasy film
 Tuesday (book), a 1991 children's picture book by David Wiesner
 Tuesday (horse), a racehorse
 Tuesday X, a character in The X's, a short-lived American animated television series
 Ruby Tuesday (restaurant), an international restaurant chain.

See also